TJ Imeľ is a Slovak football team, based in the town of Imeľ. The club was founded in 1945. Club colors are red and yellow. TJ Imeľ home stadium is Futbalový štadión TJ Imeľ with a capacity of 1,000 spectators.

Current squad

Staff

Current technical staff

Historical names
 TJ Imeľ (?–present)

External links 

 Futbalnet profile   
  

Football clubs in Slovakia
Association football clubs established in 1945
1945 establishments in Slovakia